Patrick Adiarte (born August 2, 1943) is a Filipino-born American  theater, film and television actor and dancer, known for his portrayal of foreign or Asian characters in various roles in film and television. His roles have included Prince Chulalongkorn in the Rodgers and Hammerstein musical The King and I, Wang San in Flower Drum Song, college student T.J. Padmanagham in High Time, and Ho-Jon in the television series M*A*S*H. He was a regular dancer on Hullabaloo.

Filmography

References

External links

1943 births
Living people
Filipino emigrants to the United States
American male film actors
American male musical theatre actors
American male television actors